Galk or Galak may refer to:
 Galk, Razavi Khorasan
 Galak, Sistan and Baluchestan